Wim Hof (born 20 April 1959), also known as The Iceman, is a Dutch motivational speaker and extreme athlete noted for his ability to withstand low temperatures. He previously held a Guinness World Record for swimming under ice and prolonged full-body contact with ice, and holds a record for a barefoot half marathon on ice and snow. He attributes these feats to his Wim Hof Method (WHM), a combination of frequent cold exposure, breathing techniques and meditation. Hof has been the subject of several medical assessments and The New York Times bestselling book What Doesn't Kill Us written by investigative journalist Scott Carney.

Personal life 
Wim Hof was born on April 20 1959 in Sittard, Limburg, Netherlands. He was one of nine children. Hof met his first wife Marivelle-Maria, also called “Olaya Rosino Fernandez” (born in 1960, from Basque Country, Spain) in the Vondelpark in Amsterdam in the garden of roses. She died by suicide in 1995 by jumping from an eight-story building. She was diagnosed with schizophrenia. Wim Hof’s first relevant experiences with the cold goes back to when he was 17: he felt a sudden urge to jump into the freezing cold water of the Beatrixpark canal. The first relevant scientific investigation began in 2011 at Radboud University. On 19 April 2011, the results of this study were broadcast on Dutch national television.

Wim Hof Method 
Hof markets a regimen called the Wim Hof Method (WHM), which involves willpower, exposure to cold water, and breathing techniques.

Hof states that his method can reduce symptoms of several diseases including: rheumatoid arthritis, multiple sclerosis , corona virus and Parkinson's disease. However, while hyperventilation might temporarily reduce inflammatory response to an injection of endotoxins, Hof's claims have not been scientifically proven.

Wouter van Marken Lichtenbelt, one of the scientists who studied Hof, said: "[Hof's] scientific vocabulary is galimatias. With conviction, he mixes in a non-sensical way scientific terms as irrefutable evidence." However, Van Marken Lichtenbelt goes on to say: "When practicing the Wim Hof Method with a good dose of common sense (for instance, not hyperventilating before submerging in water) and without excessive expectations: it doesn't hurt to try."

Studies on Hof individually 
In 2012, a case study led by a group of researchers in The Netherlands and published by the journal Psychosomatic Medicine titled The Influence of Concentration/meditation on Autonomic Nervous System Activity and the Innate Immune Response, found that his "concentration/meditation during ice immersion" greatly reduced his "ex vivo proinflammatory and anti-inflammatory cytokine response":"The concentration/meditation technique used by this particular individual seems to evoke a controlled stress response. This response is characterized by sympathetic nervous system activation and subsequent catecholamine/cortisol release, which seems to attenuate the innate immune response."

In 2014 an assessment compared Wim Hof and his identical twin brother Andre. The scientists had them practice Wim's breathing exercises, then exposed them to the lowest temperature that would not induce shivering. They concluded that, "No significant differences were found between the two subjects, indicating that a lifestyle with frequent exposures to extreme cold does not seem to affect BAT activity and CIT (cold-induced thermogenesis)." The researchers stated that the "results must be interpreted with caution given the low subject number and the fact that both participants practised the g-Tummo-like breathing technique."

In 2018, a study published in the journal NeuroImage titled Brain over body–A study on the willful regulation of autonomic function during cold exposure, used a combination of fMRI and PET/CT imaging, and found, "forceful respiration results in increased sympathetic innervation and glucose consumption in intercostal muscle, generating heat that dissipates to lung tissue and warms circulating blood in the pulmonary capillaries. Our results provide compelling evidence for the primacy of the brain (CNS) rather than the body (peripheral mechanisms) in mediating the Iceman's [Wim Hof's] responses to cold exposure."

Studies on Wim Hof Method 
In 2014, a paper published in PNAS titled Voluntary Activation of The Sympathetic Nervous System and Attenuation of the Innate Immune Response In Humans, extended the 2012 case study of Wim Hof with a randomized group of twenty-four healthy volunteers, twelve of whom were trained with the Wim Hof Method:"In conclusion, we demonstrate that voluntary activation of the sympathetic nervous system results in epinephrine release and subsequent suppression of the innate immune response in humans in vivo. These results could have important implications for the treatment of conditions associated with excessive or persistent inflammation, such as autoimmune diseases."In 2014, a report written by Geert A. Buijze, MD, PhD and Maria T. Hopman, MD, PhD titled Controlled Hyperventilation After Training May Accelerate Altitude Acclimatization, dealt with the effects of the Wim Hof Method on acute mountain sickness (AMS). During an expedition to Mt. Kilimanjaro, a group of 26 trekkers who were trained in the Wim Hof Method used the breathing techniques to largely prevent and, if needed, reverse symptoms of AMS:"In comparison with previous studies,4,5 this report may suggest that acclimatization, as well as AMS symptom relief, can be safely accelerated. Based on previous data, it was expected that the majority of our group would experience severe AMS. All 26 trekkers had symptoms of AMS to some extent, but even without prophylaxis, none had severe AMS. Even though we discourage (very) rapid ascent because of potentially lethal risks, we consider these outcomes of potentially great relevance for the prevention and treatment of AMS, as well as for rescue teams needing to ascend fast with little time for acclimatization. Further research is warranted to expand or revise our understanding of the physiology and treatment of these conditions."In 2015, a proof-of-principle study titled The Role of Outcome Expectancies for a Training Program Consisting of Meditation, Breathing Exercises, and Cold Exposure on the Response to Endotoxin Administration, demonstrated that the WHM can attenuate the inflammatory response, "through practicing techniques that are relatively easy to learn within a short time frame", but "It remains to be determined whether the results of this study using an acute model of inflammation in healthy volunteers can be extrapolated to patients with chronic autoimmune diseases."

In 2018, the RMIT University in Melbourne, Australia, conducted a survey asking people around the world what impact the Wim Hof method had on their lives. More than 3,200 people responded. In 2019, a proof of concept trial titled Battling Arthritis-An add-on training program involving breathing exercises, cold exposure, and meditation attenuates inflammation and disease activity in axial spondyloarthritis, concluded that: "There was a significant decrease in ESR levels and ASDAS-CRP upon the add-on training program in the intervention group. These findings warrant full-scale randomised controlled trials of this novel therapeutic approach in patients with inflammatory conditions."

In 2020, an article titled Involvement of lactate and pyruvate in the anti-inflammatory effects exerted by voluntary activation of the sympathetic nervous system, concluded that: "Practicing the breathing exercises acquired during the training program results in enhanced activity of the Cori cycle, and next to the previously established relationship between epinephrine and IL-10 induction, the current data indicate a role of lactate and pyruvate in the enhanced production of this key anti-inflammatory mediator and in the overall anti-inflammatory phenotype observed in trained subjects."

A 2021 pilot study on fifteen sprinters concluded that the WHM caused side effects and "did not enhance any performance parameter (peak power, average power, and FI) in later sprint sets." The researchers concluded that "Based on the results found in this study, we do not recommend applying this method with the view of improving performance, at least not for repeated sprinting."

In 2022, a pilot study titled The Effects of Cold Exposure Training and a Breathing Exercise on the Inflammatory Response in Humans showed that:"The combination of cold exposure training and a breathing exercise most potently attenuates the in vivo inflammatory response in healthy young males. Our study demonstrates that the immunomodulatory effects of the intervention can be reproduced in a standardized manner, thereby paving the way for clinical trials."

A 2022 study found that a "4 week intervention exercise based on the pillar of the Wim Hof breathing method was not effective in improving the breathing economy of adolescent elite endurance runners." The authors recommended proven interventions such as yogic breath training instead.

Method-related deaths 
At least nine people have died while attempting the Wim Hof Method. Four practitioners drowned in 2015 and 2016, and relatives suspected the breathing exercises were to blame. In 2021, a Singaporean man drowned in a condominium pool when attempting the method. At least one person has died from a heart attack after cold-water immersion. The leading cause of death with Wim Hof Method-related activities seems to be shallow water blackout where practitioners hyperventilate in or around water and unexpectedly lose consciousness. Though Wim Hof's safety video explicitly states doing breathwork in water is dangerous, Wim Hof has been filmed teaching deep-breathing techniques to instructors in water as late as 2023.

Records and stunts 
In an interview with Rolling Stone, Hof claimed to have acquired a total of 26 world records, though no systematic evaluation of these records is listed anywhere.

Fastest half-marathon barefoot on ice and snow 
The fastest half marathon run while barefoot on ice or snow is 2 hr 16 min 34 sec by Hof near Oulu, Finland, on 26 January 2007. Done for the Discovery Channel program Real Super-humans and the Quest for the Future Fantastic, this is the only current Guinness record in Hof's name.

Swimming under ice 
Hof's first attempt the day before failed when he began his swim without goggles and his corneas froze solid and blinded him. A rescue diver pulled him to the surface after he passed out.

Full-body contact with ice 
Hof has set the world record for longest time in direct, full-body contact with ice, 1 hour, 44 minutes in January 2010. Hof's record has been broken several times and as of 2021 it stands at 3 hours, 28 seconds.

Mountaineering in shorts 
He managed to climb from base camp to about  wearing just shorts and sandals, but after that he had to wear boots. 

In 2016, Hof reached Gilmans Point on Mount Kilimanjaro with journalist Scott Carney in 28 hours, an event later documented in the book What Doesn't Kill Us.

Publications

 
 
 
 
 Carney, Scott and Wim Hof (introduction). (2017) What Doesn't Kill Us: How Freezing Water, Extreme Altitude and Environmental Conditioning Will Renew Our Lost Evolutionary Strength. ISBN 9781635652413

See also 
 Breathwork
 Diaphragmatic breathing
 Hormesis
 Ice bath
 Kundalini
 Meditation
 Tummo
 Yoga

References

External links 

 
 
 UnfoldingMaps.com – Interview with Wim Hof by podcast Unfolding Maps (2020)
 VICE Documentary
 YesTheory Documentary

1959 births
Living people
Breathwork practitioners
Dutch businesspeople
Dutch male long-distance runners
Dutch male marathon runners
Ice sports
People from Sittard